The United States Senate Committee on Conservation of National Resources was established in 1909 and terminated in 1921.

Chairmen of the Committee on Conservation of National Resources
Joseph M. Dixon (R-MT) 1910-1913
Marcus A. Smith (D-AZ) 1913
James K. Vardaman (D-MS) 1913-1918
Ellison D. Smith (D-SC) 1918-1919
LeBaron B. Colt (R-RI) 1919-1921

Conservation of National Resources
1909 establishments in Washington, D.C.
1921 disestablishments in Washington, D.C.
Nature conservation in the United States